These are the list of results that England have played from 1950 to 1959.

1950 
Scores and results list England's points tally first.

1951 
Scores and results list England's points tally first.

1952 
Scores and results list England's points tally first.

1953 
Scores and results list England's points tally first.

1954 
Scores and results list England's points tally first.

1955 
Scores and results list England's points tally first.

1956 
Scores and results list England's points tally first.

1957 
Scores and results list England's points tally first.

1958 
Scores and results list England's points tally first.

1959 
Scores and results list England's points tally first.

Year Box 

1950–59
1949–50 in English rugby union
1950–51 in English rugby union
1951–52 in English rugby union
1952–53 in English rugby union
1953–54 in English rugby union
1954–55 in English rugby union
1955–56 in English rugby union
1956–57 in English rugby union
1957–58 in English rugby union
1958–59 in English rugby union